Antinea Airlines was a passenger and cargo airline based in Algiers Houari Boumedienne Airport, Algeria that was founded in June 1999. The airline was merged into Khalifa Airways in 2001, and the company ceased to exist in 2003.

See also		
 List of defunct airlines of Algeria

References

External links
 
 Antinea Airlines timetable

Defunct airlines of Algeria
Airlines established in 1999
Airlines disestablished in 2003
1999 establishments in Algeria
2003 disestablishments in Algeria